The Abucea is a left tributary of the river Mureș in Romania. It discharges into the Mureș in Abucea.

References 

Rivers of Romania
Rivers of Hunedoara County